Forgacs Shipyard  is a shipbuilding company located at Tomago, New South Wales on the Hunter River. It was originally opened in 1957 by John Laverick at Carrington as Carrington Slipways, and built 45 ships between then and 1968. By 1972, the business required larger premises and moved to Tomago, not far from the Pacific Highway. The shipyard was purchased by Forgacs Engineering in 1997.

Ships built by Carrington Slipways

References

External links
 
 

History of Newcastle, New South Wales
Port Stephens Council
Shipbuilding companies of Australia
Australian companies established in 1957
Shipyards of New South Wales